The Abbot of Paisley (later Commendator of Paisley; Prior of Paisley before 1219) was the head of the Cluniac monastic community of Paisley Abbey and its property. The monastery was founded as a priory at Renfrew in 1163, but moved to Paisley in 1169. It became an abbey in 1219. The founder was Walter fitz Alan, Seneschal (Steward) of Scotland. The line of abbots ended when it was turned into a secular lordship for Lord Claud Hamilton in 1587/1592. The following is a list of abbots and commendators:

List of priors
 ???, 1163 x 1165
 Osbert, 1173-1180x1192
 Roger, 1195 x 1196 -1208 x 1214

List of abbots
 ???, 1220
 William, 1225/6 -1238, 1248?
 Stephen, 1272–1285
 Walter, 1296
 A[ ? ], 1301
 Roger, 1318–1325
 John, 1327
 James, 1349
 John, 1362–1370
 John de Lithgow I, 1384-1408 x 1412
 Alan de Govan, 1412
 John de Lychcar, 1412
 William de Cheshelme, 1414
 Roland, 1414-1415
 John de Lithgow II (?Lychcar), 1415-1431 x 1432
 Thomas Morrow, 1418–1444
 Richard Bothwell, 1444–1445
 Thomas de Tarveis, 1445–1459
 Henry Crichton, 1459–1471
 Patrick Graham, 1466–1471
 George Shaw, 1471–1499
 Robert Shaw, 1498–1525

List of commendators
 John Hamilton, 1525-1553
 Claude Hamilton, 1553–1587
 Robert Lord Sempill, 1569–1573
 William Erskine, 1581-1584
 Claude Hamilton, 1586-1592 as 1st Lord Paisley

See also
 Paisley Abbey

Notes

Bibliography
 Cowan, Ian B. & Easson, David E., Medieval Religious Houses: Scotland With an Appendix on the Houses in the Isle of Man, Second Edition, (London, 1976), pp. 64–5
 Watt, D.E.R. & Shead, N.F. (eds.), The Heads of Religious Houses in Scotland from the 12th to the 16th Centuries, The Scottish Records Society, New Series, Volume 24, (Edinburgh, 2001), pp. 167–73

Cluniacs
Scottish abbots
Lists of abbots